is a 2013 Japanese suspense film directed by Junji Sakamoto, starring Kōichi Satō, Mirai Moriyama, Alisa Mizuki, Shingo Katori, Yoo Ji-tae, Vincent Gallo, and Tatsuya Nakadai. It was filmed in Japan, Russia, Thailand, and the United States.

Plot 
In 2014, Yuichi Mafune (Kōichi Satō), a confidence man, is hired by "M" (Shingo Katori) to steal 10 trillion yen from the M Fund and use it for humanitarian assistance to the Third World. Harold Marcus (Vincent Gallo), an investment banker, sends Osamu Endo (Yoo Ji-tae), an assassin, to stop them.

Cast 
 Kōichi Satō as Yuichi Mafune
 Mirai Moriyama as Seki Yukit
 Alisa Mizuki as Miyuki Takato
 Shingo Katori as Nobuto "M" Sasakura
 Tatsuya Nakadai as Nobuhiko Sasakura
 Vincent Gallo as Harold Marcus
 Yoo Ji-tae as Osamu Endo
 Etsushi Toyokawa as Harry Endo
 Ittoku Kishibe as Kazuyoshi Honjo
 Joe Odagiri as Eiji Kugenuma
 Susumu Terajima as Tadashi Sakata
 Renji Ishibashi as Detective Kitamura

Reception 
Elizabeth Kerr of The Hollywood Reporter gave the film a mixed review, saying: "Technically the film is competent if unremarkable and the (occasionally wooden) cast does what it can with the material, which forces them all to swing wildly between melodramatic thriller mode and standard action hero antics". Meanwhile, Mark Schilling of The Japan Times gave it 2 out of 5 stars, saying: "Even stranger is the climax, which features a lengthy speech that makes Charlie Chaplin's famous peroration in The Great Dictator seem like a model of compression and restraint. Chaplin at least had the excuse of railing against Nazism. Sakamoto and Fukui are simply guilty of equating real-world politics with high school speech contests."

References

External links 
 
 

Films directed by Junji Sakamoto
2013 films
2010s thriller films
Japanese thriller films
Japanese films set in New York City
2010s Japanese films
Foreign films set in the United States